Arisaema section Franchetiana is a section of the genus Arisaema.

Description
Plants in this section have purple globose tubers with one to two 3-foliolate leaves.

Distribution
Plants from this section are found in China and Myanmar.

Species
Arisaema section Franchetiana comprises the following species:

References

Plant sections